Copland v United Kingdom [2007] ECHR 253 is an ECHR case about UK labour law, English contract law case and health care in the UK.

Facts
Lynette Copland was employed by Carmarthenshire College as personal assistant to the College Principal. The Deputy Principal had monitored her email. The Deputy then insinuated to other staff that she was in a personal relationship with another employee. The UK claimed the College could monitor Copland’s emails and use of the internet. The college’s statutory powers enabled it to do ‘anything necessary or expedient for the purposes of providing higher or further education’. ‘The applicant also believed that there had been detailed and comprehensive logging of the length of calls, the number of calls received and made and the telephone numbers of individuals calling her. She stated that on at least one occasion the DP became aware of the name of an individual with whom she had exchanged incoming and outgoing telephone calls.’ An internet ‘monitoring took the form of analysing the web sites visited, the times and dates of the visits to the web sites and their duration and that this monitoring took place from October to November 1999.’ She claimed this violated her right to private life and correspondence under ECHR article 8.

Judgment
The European Court of Human Rights held an implied right to monitor internet ‘unpersuasive’.

See also
United Kingdom labour law
English contract case law

Notes

References

English contract case law
United Kingdom labour case law